On Green Dolphin Street  is a record album credited to jazz musician Bill Evans. It was released in 1977 through the Victor Music Industries Inc. Japanese label as an imprint for Riverside. The songs were recorded in 1959.

The album title comes from the song On Green Dolphin Street, a jazz standard that Evans recorded on the album.

The CD edition catalogued as MCD-9235-2 does not include "Loose Bloose".  However, it does contain a rare first take of "All of You" from the Village Vanguard engagement by the 1961 Evans Trio with bassist Scott LaFaro and drummer Paul Motian.

Reception

Writing for Allmusic, music critic Scott Yanow wrote of the album: "Although lacking the magic of Evans' regular bands, this CD reissue has its strong moments and the pianist's fans will be interested in getting the early sampling of his work. A special bonus is the rare first take of "All of You" from the legendary Village Vanguard engagement by the 1961 Evans Trio (with bassist Scott LaFaro and drummer Paul Motian)."

Track listing

LP
 "You and the Night and the Music" (Howard Dietz, Arthur Schwartz) – 7:24
 "My Heart Stood Still" (Richard Rodgers, Lorenz Hart) – 5:25
 "On Green Dolphin Street" (Bronislaw Kaper, Ned Washington) – 8:12
 "How Am I to Know?" (Jack King, Dorothy Parker) – 6:22
 "Woody 'n' You" (Take 1) (Dizzy Gillespie) – 4:28
 "Woody 'n' You" (Take 2) (Dizzy Gillespie) – 4:13
 "Loose Bloose" (Bill Evans) – 5:36

CD 
 "You and the Night and the Music" 7:20
 "How Am I to Know?" 6:22
 "Woody 'n' You" (Take 1) 4:25
 "Woody 'n' You" (Take 2) 4:13
 "My Heart Stood Still" 5:25
 "On Green Dolphin Street" 8:12
 "All of You" (Take 1) (Cole Porter) 8:10

Note
Track 7 recorded on January 25, 1961, at the Village Vanguard, New York City.

Personnel 

Bill Evans – piano
 Paul Chambers – bass (tracks 1–6)
Philly Joe Jones – drums (except on "All of You" (Take 1))
Ron Carter – bass (on "Loose Bloose" only)
Jim Hall – guitar (on "Loose Bloose" only)
Zoot Sims – sax (on "Loose Bloose" only)
 Scott LaFaro – bass (on "All of You" (Take 1) only)
Paul Motian – drums (on "All of You" (Take 1) only)

References

External links
Jazz Discography entries for Bill Evans
Bill Evans Memorial Library discography

1975 albums
Bill Evans albums
Milestone Records albums
Albums produced by Orrin Keepnews